Ewa Strömberg (13 January 1940 - 24 January 2013), was a Swedish actress. She appeared in a number of Swedish films before her international career. She is possibly best known for her appearance in a number of films by Spanish director Jesús "Jess" Franco, most notably Vampyros Lesbos (1971). She retired from the film industry shortly afterwards.

Selected filmography 
Raggare! (dir. Olle Hellbom, 1959) 
 (dir. Håkan Ersgård, 1965)
 (dir. Arne Mattsson, 1967)
The Monk with the Whip (dir. Alfred Vohrer, 1967)
Im Banne des Unheimlichen (dir. Alfred Vohrer, 1968)
 (dir. Wolfgang Staudte, 1968)
Kampf um Rom (dir. Robert Siodmak, 1968)
 The Man with the Glass Eye (dir. Alfred Vohrer, 1969)
The Wedding Trip (dir. Ralf Gregan, 1969)
The Devil Came from Akasava (dir. Jesús Franco, 1971)
Vampyros Lesbos (dir. Jesús Franco, 1971)
 (dir. Jesús Franco, 1971)
She Killed in Ecstasy (dir. Jesús Franco, 1971)
 (dir. Jesús Franco, 1971)

References

External links 

1940 births
2013 deaths
Swedish film actresses
20th-century Swedish actresses